Deborah Chester (born 1957) is an American author of over 40 books, primarily science fiction and fantasy novels. She currently holds the John Crain Presidential Professorship at the University of Oklahoma, teaching both undergraduate and graduate courses on writing style and structure in the Gaylord College of Journalism and Mass Communication.

Chester began her career penning romance novels but eventually moved into a variety of genres including adult fiction, science fiction, and fantasy. She has written novels based on popular science fiction television series such as Lucasfilm's Alien Chronicles and Earth 2.

Ace Books released Chester's newest novel, The Pearls, on November 27, 2007.

Jim Butcher, author of The Dresden Files, has named her as his primary mentor.

Bibliography

Ruby Throne
 Reign of Shadows (1996)
 Shadow War (1996)
 Realm of Light (1997)

Alien Chronicles
 The Golden One (1997)
 The Crimson Claw (1998)
 The Crystal Eye (1999)

Nether and Mandria

Dain
 Dain: The Queen's Gambit (2002)
 Dain: The King Betrayed (2003)
 Dain: The Queen's Knight (2004)
 Dain: The King Imperiled (2005)

The Sword, the Ring and the Chalice
 The Sword (2000)
 The Ring (2000)
 The Chalice (2001)

The Pearls and the Crown
 The Pearls (2007)
 The Crown (2008)

Anthi
 The Children of Anthi (1985 - as Jay D. Blakeney)
 Requiem for Anthi (1990 - as Jay D. Blakeney)

Operation Starhawks
 Space Hawks (1990 - as Sean Dalton)
 Code Name Peregrine (1990 - as Sean Dalton)
 Beyond the Void (1991 - as Sean Dalton)
 The Rostma Lure (1991 - as Sean Dalton)
 Destination Mutiny (1991 - as Sean Dalton)
 The Salukan Gambit (1992 - as Sean Dalton)

Time-Trap
 Time Trap (1992 - as Sean Dalton)
 Showdown (1992 - as Sean Dalton)
 Pieces of Eight (1992 - as Sean Dalton)
 Restoration (1994 - as Sean Dalton)
 Turncoat (1994 - as Sean Dalton)
 Termination (1995 - as Sean Dalton)

Earth 2
 Puzzle (1995 - as Sean Dalton)

Other novels
 A Love So Wild (1979)
 French Slippers (1981)
 The Sign of the Owl (1981)
 Royal Intrigue (1982)
 Summer's Rapture (1983)
 Hearts Desire (1983)
 Burning Secrets (1984)
 Sweet Passions (1985)
 The Omcri Matrix (1987 - as Jay D. Blakeney)
 Captured Hearts (1989)
 The Goda War (1989 - as Jay D. Blakeney)

Short fiction
 "The Street that Forgot Time" short story in Twilight Zone: 19 Original Stories on the 50th Anniversary (2009)

References

Sources
 http://www.ou.edu/content/gaylord/home/main/faculty_staff/deborah_chester.html
 http://www.fantasticfiction.co.uk/c/deborah-chester/
 http://www.deborahchester.com/bibliography.html

External links
 

1957 births
Living people
20th-century American novelists
21st-century American novelists
American science fiction writers
American women short story writers
American women novelists
Women science fiction and fantasy writers
20th-century American women writers
21st-century American women writers
20th-century American short story writers
21st-century American short story writers